Sign In Please is the debut studio album by American glam metal band Autograph. Released by RCA Records in 1984, the album features the band's only hit and signature song, "Turn Up the Radio".

"Turn Up the Radio" was featured in a variety of media in the coming decades and is regarded as an '80s glam metal staple.

Background
According to lead guitarist Steve Lynch, the album took 30 days to record and master; "We were seasoned musicians in the studio so worked very fast and were always well prepared." He also noted that its major hit, "Turn Up the Radio", was recorded at the tail end of the Sign in Please sessions and that RCA didn't find it suitable enough for inclusion. However, after stern insistence, the band was able to get it on the album. Neither party, however, expected it to gain such critical success that led to the album's gold status in 1985.

Track listing

Uses in popular culture 

 "Turn Up the Radio" was featured in the 2002 action-adventure video game Grand Theft Auto: Vice City on the in-game rock radio station and during the fight with Konstantin Brayko in 2010 action role-playing video game Alpha Protocol.
 The track "All I'm Gonna Take" was featured in the 2006 action-adventure video game Grand Theft Auto: Vice City Stories.
 "Turn Up the Radio" was featured in the 2010 science-fiction comedy film Hot Tub Time Machine.

Personnel

Autograph 
Steve Plunkett - lead vocals, guitar
Steve Lynch - lead guitar
Randy Rand - bass, backing vocals
Steven Isham - keyboards, backing vocals
Keni Richards - drums, "noises"

Production 
Neil Kernon - producer, engineer, mixing
Eddie DeLena - engineer, mixing
Bernie Grundman - mastering

Charts

Album

Weekly Charts

Year-end charts

Singles

Turn Up the Radio

Certifications

References

1984 debut albums
Autograph (American band) albums
Albums produced by Neil Kernon
RCA Records albums